Bahour (East) is a village in  Commune in the Union Territory of Puducherry, India. It consists of few areas of Bahour and the entire part of Bahourpet.

Geography
Bahour (East) is bordered by Bahour(West) in the west, Kudiyiruppupalayam in the north, Manapattu, Krishnavaram in the east and Parikkalpattu in the south.

Road Network
Kanniakoil–Bahour Road (RC-28) passes through Bahour(East). This road connects Bahour with National Highways-45A.

Gallery

References

External links
Official website of the Government of the Union Territory of Puducherry

Villages in Puducherry district